Chlaenius is a large and diverse genus of ground beetle. It is native to the Palearctic realm (including Europe, the Near East, and North Africa), Afrotropical realm, and Nearctic realm. Worldwide, roughly 1,000 species are currently recognized  with the majority of known species occurring in the Oriental and Afrotropical regions. The genus is divided into many subgenera.

Species

Parasites

In Australia, Chlaenius flaviguttatus Macleay is parasitized by a species of mite, Eutarsopolipus chlaenii Katlav & Hajiqanbar, 2021 which dwells under the elytra.

References

External links

Chlaenius at BugGuide (North America)

Licininae
Carabidae genera
Taxa named by Franco Andrea Bonelli